Faranah Region is located in east-central Guinea. It is bordered by the countries of Sierra Leone and Mali and the Guinean regions of Kankan, Mamou, Nzérékoré, and Labé.

Administrative divisions
Faranah Region is divided into four prefectures; which are further sub-divided into 42 sub-prefectures:

 Dabola Prefecture (9 sub-prefectures)
 Dinguiraye Prefecture (8 sub-prefectures)
 Faranah Prefecture (12 sub-prefectures)
 Kissidougou Prefecture (13 sub-prefectures)

Geography
Faranah Region is traversed by the northwesterly line of equal latitude and longitude.

References

 

Regions of Guinea